Newbridge is a small village in the community of Ciliau Aeron, Ceredigion, Wales. Newbridge is on the A482 road between Aberaeron and Lampeter.

It is represented in the Senedd by Elin Jones (Plaid Cymru) and is part of the Ceredigion constituency in the House of Commons.

References 

Villages in Ceredigion